Reproductive value is a term used by some social psychologists to describe reproductive capacity and potential reproductive success of female humans. The term can also describe the characteristics that people evaluate, consciously or unconsciously, when choosing female partners.

See also
 Hypergamy

References

Interpersonal attraction
Interpersonal relationships